Veľké Vozokany is a village and municipality in Zlaté Moravce District of the Nitra Region, in western-central Slovakia.

History
In historical records the village was first mentioned in 1209. The community of Veľké Vozokany is certified to have existed by 1228. The Roman Catholic St. Nicolas Church is originally a Gothic structure that received Baroque modifications in 1742 and was further rebuilt in the 19th century. The whole settlement was once a property of the Abbey of Hronský Beňadik.

On August 26, 1652, one of the most significant battles against the Turks in the region was fought here, at a place called Lech near Starý háj (“Old Grove“). Ádám Forgách, then commander of the fortress of Nové Zámky, bravely led his troops, supported by local people and the garrisons of Vráble and Levice against Turkish troops commanded by Mustafa. Despite outnumbering their enemy almost three times, the Turks suffered a bitter defeat. The four Esterházy brothers were among those killed in battle and they were buried on November 26, 1652 in the crypt of Trnava's University Church.
The battlefield was marked by a 5 metre tall obelisk commemorating the victory and the sacrifice of the four brothers, erected in 1734. In 1896 it was replaced by the memorial we can see today—a white travertine pedestal with a bronze sculpture of a lion crushing a Turkish battle flag. The pedestal bears a Latin inscription that reads: “Hold on, traveller, and read!“. Author is Vojtech Markup.

Culture
In the village is brass music band, singing group Lipa, children singing club Vozokanček and a theater group.

Geography
The municipality lies at an elevation of 180 metres  and covers an area of 9.879 km² (3.814 mi²). It has a population of about 500.

References

External links
http://www.e-obce.sk/obec/velkevozokany/velke-vozokany.html

Villages and municipalities in Zlaté Moravce District